Hindustan Football Club is an Indian professional football club based in New Delhi. Founded in 1948, the club usually participated in the I-League 2nd Division, the second tier of Indian football league system. They currently participate in the Delhi Premier League and use Ambedkar Stadium as home ground, in addition to Jawaharlal Nehru Stadium for selected matches.

History

Formation and early history
Hindustan FC was founded in 1948 in New Delhi. Thus it became one of the oldest football club from the capital city of India. The club has been affiliated with Delhi Soccer Association (DSA), which is now known as Football Delhi, and participate in the DSA Senior Division league (now named Delhi Premier League). They are one time champion of the league and lifted the title in 2001–02 season.

In November 2002, Hindustan participated in the inaugural edition of Delhi Lt. Governor's Cup and reached to the semi-finals. The club later competed in the National Football League Second Division continuously in 2004–05, 2005–06 and 2006–07 seasons, but were not granted the permission of joining the newly formed I-League II (then second-tier) for not fulfilling the AFC club licensing criteria. In 2007, Hindustan FC roped in their first foreign coach, Bernard Operanozie from Nigeria.

Hindustan clinched their second DSA Senior Division title in 2009 season as co-winners with Indian National FC.

Present years
Hindustan Football Academy was started by the former club chairman D. K. Bose, and they roped in Spanish professional coach Óscar Bruzón on board for a period of two years to train Delhi's budding footballers in the age group of under-12 and under-16.

Hindustan FC, founded just after the independence of India, have been the flag bearers from the capital in the second tier of Indian football, having participated for a record 14 times. They also participated in the 2014 I-League 2nd Division and moved to the Final Round of I-League Qualifiers, finishing on fifth position with four points in eight matches.

Though their biggest achievement is finishing as the runners-up in the 2017–18 I-League 2nd Division, under the coaching of Vikrant Sharma. In the 2018–19 I-League 2nd Division, Hindustan finished at the bottom of the Group A and bowed out of the tournament.

The club has participated in the 2021 FD Senior Division, and finished as runners-up.

Stadium

Ambedkar Stadium in Delhi is used as the clubs' home ground for most of their DSA Senior Division League matches. It has also hosted I-League 2nd Division matches. The stadium has a capacity of 35,000 spectators. Hindustan also use Thyagaraj Sports Complex ground.

Rivalries
Hindustan FC have nurtured rivalries with other Delhi based clubs, predominantly with Garhwal, Simla Youngs, Indian Air Force, New Delhi Heroes and Sudeva Moonlight (now 'Sudeva Delhi'). Besides the state league, they faced some more rivals in the prestigious Durand Cup, the oldest existing club football tournament in Asia and third oldest in the world.

Kit manufacturers and shirt sponsors

Women's team
On 29 November 2012, Hindustan FC launched its women's team with the unveiling of team jersey. At a press conference, Hindustan president Sushil Pandit said that the decision to launch the team was in line with the club philosophy to support women's football.

The women's team competes in the Delhi Women's Football League, organised by Football Delhi. Its U17 women's team has been participating in the Khelo India Women's League since 2019.

Youth football
In 2013, Hindustan FC launched its U19 team to participate in the Elite League (India). The U19 team was from Delhi zone and first participated in the 2014–15 I-League U19 season (group D – rest of India), and reached the final round.

Honours

League
 I-League 2nd Division
Runners-up (1): 2017–18
 DSA/FD Senior Division League
Champions (2): 2001–02, 2008–09
Runners-up (7): 1996, 1998, 2000, 2002–03, 2005, 2008–09, 2021–22

Cup
Lal Bahadur Shastri Cup
Runners-up (1): 1995

Notable players
For current and former notable Hindustan FC players with a Wikipedia article, see: Hindustan FC players.

Managerial history

 Bernard Operanozie (2007–2008)
 Monoranjan Bhattacharya (2008–2009)
 Tope Ayodeji Fuja (2011–2012)
 Michiteru Mita (2012–2014)
 Abhijoy basu (2014–2017)
 Vikrant Sharma (2017–2018)
 Sena Sena (2018–present)

See also
 List of football clubs in Delhi
 Sport in Delhi

References

Further reading

External links

Hindustan Football Club profile and statistics at Global Sports Archive

Hindustan FC fixtures and results at Scorebing
Hindustan FC fixtures and results at Sofascore

Association football clubs established in 1948
1948 establishments in India
Football clubs in New Delhi
I-League 2nd Division clubs